John Legbourne was an English priest in the  early 15th century.

Elvet was born in Durham and was an executor of John of Gaunt.  The Master of the Jewel Office, in 1424 he exchanged the benefice of Sedgefield for the Archdeaconry of Leicester with Richard Elvet.

Notes

See also
 Diocese of Lincoln
 Diocese of Peterborough
 Diocese of Leicester
 Archdeacon of Leicester

Archdeacons of Leicester
15th-century English clergy
People from Durham, England